Thomas Robert Bohrer (born August 6, 1963) is an American rower. He has won two silver medals in the men's coxless fours. One at the 1992 Summer Olympics in Barcelona and the other at the 1988 Summer Olympics in Seoul along with Richard Kennelly, David Krmpotich, and Raoul Rodriguez. He competed for the Penn Athletic Club Rowing Association under head coach, Ted Nash (rower).

Born in West Islip, New York, he is a 1986 graduate of Florida Institute of Technology and has been head coach of Boston University men's crew since 2008. He was inducted into the Suffolk Sports Hall of Fame on Long Island in the Boating & Nautical Category with the Class of 1990.

References

External links 
 

1963 births
Living people
American male rowers
Boston University faculty
Florida Institute of Technology alumni
Olympic silver medalists for the United States in rowing
Rowers at the 1988 Summer Olympics
Rowers at the 1992 Summer Olympics
People from West Islip, New York
World Rowing Championships medalists for the United States
Medalists at the 1992 Summer Olympics
Medalists at the 1988 Summer Olympics